Stylogomphus sigmastylus, the interior least clubtail, is a species of clubtail dragonfly in the family of dragonflies known as Gomphidae. It is found in North America.

The IUCN conservation status of Stylogomphus sigmastylus is "LC", least concern, with no immediate threat to the species' survival. The population is stable.

References

Further reading

 
 

Gomphidae
Articles created by Qbugbot
Insects described in 2004